Rudolf Herfurtner (born 19 October 1947) is a German writer.

Life 
Born in Wasserburg am Inn, Herfurtner graduated from the Luitpold-Oberrealschule in Wasserburg. After the death of his parents in 1965, he moved to Munich. There he studied German Studies, English Studies and Theatre Studies from 1968 and graduated in 1975 with a Magister Artium.
 
While still a student, Herfurtner contributed texts to the feuilleton of a Munich daily newspaper and began a volontariat at the television division of Bayerischer Rundfunk. In 1973, the Ravensburger Herfurtner's first book Hinter dem Paradies.

Herfurtner writes mainly youth literature (short stories, youth novels, plays, radio plays and contributions for television).

Awards 
 1981 Förderpreis der Stadt München 
 1985 Hans-im-Glück-Preis for Das Ende der Pflaumenbäume
 1990 Preis der Leseratten for Mensch Karnickel
 1993 Deutscher Kinderhörspielpreis for Motzarella und die Weihnachtswölfe
 1994 „Moritz“, Preis der 9. Werkstatttage, Halle for Der Nibeljunge
 1996 Deutscher Kindertheater-Preis for Waldkinder
 2000 Preis der Bayerische Theatertage for Spatz Fritz
 2001 
 2001 Hansjörg-Martin-Preis of the "Autorengruppe deutschsprachige Kriminalliteratur" – Das Syndikat  for Milo und die Jagd nach dem grünhaarigen Mädchen
 2002 Großer Preis der Deutschen Akademie für Kinder- und Jugendliteratur e.V. Volkach
 2005 LesePeter März for Tims wundersame Sternenreise
 2012 Goldener Spatz for the best script Tom und Hacke

Work 
 Brennende Gitarre. Ist Jimi Hendrix wirklich tot?, novel, 1980
 Hard Rock, novel, 1981
 Simon Frasers lange Reise zum Pazifik, novel, 1981
 Hinter dem Paradies, 1983
 Käpt’n Erwin segelt zur Schokoladeninsel, 1984
 Rita, Rita, tales, 1984
 Der liebste Malte aller Zeiten, 1985
 Das Ende der Pflaumenbäume? Eine Novelle, 1985
 Der Wald unterm Dach, 1985
 Regula radelt rum. Ein Bilderbuch (pictures by Michael Keller), 1986
 Das Taubenmädchen, 1987
 Hurra, wir ziehen um (illustrated by Stephen Cartwright), 1987
 Wir sind im Kindergarten (illustrated by Stephen Cartwright), 1987
 Hurra, wir feiern ein Kinderfest (illustrated by Stephen Cartwright), 1987
 Wir bekommen ein Baby (illustrated by Stephen Cartwright), 1987
 Wir gehen zum Zahnarzt (illustrated by Stephen Cartwright), 1987
 Wir gehen ins Krankenhaus (illustrated by Stephen Cartwright), 1987
 Rosalinds Elefant und Rudi Rudi Wolldecke (illustrated by Reinhard Michl), 1988
 Gloria von Jaxtberg oder die Prinzessin vom Pfandlhof (pictures by Reinhard Michl), 1988
 Das Christkind fliegt ums Haus, 1988
 Brausepulver. Geschichten aus den 50er Jahren, 1989
 Mensch Karnickel, 1990
 Wunderjahre. Hannas Geschichte, 1991
 Der Nibeljunge, Theaterstück, 1992
 Motzarella und die Weihnachtswölfe (pictures by Werner Blaebst), 1992
 Papa, du sollst kommen (pictures by Reinhard Michl), 1992
 Motzarella und der Geburtstagsdrache (pictures by Werner Blaebst), 1993
 Lieber Nichtsnutz, 1993
 Kleiner Kater – große Welt, 1995
 Liebe Grüße, Dein Coco, 1995
 Muschelkind, 1995
 Robert fährt im Bus zur Schule, 1997 
 Träne und Meikk. Mit wilden Schwänen durch die Nacht, 1997
 Gumpert Blubb (pictures by Reinhard Michl), 1997
 Waldkinder (pictures by Antoni Boratyński), 1997
 Der wasserdichte Willibald (illustrated by Barbara Schumann), 1997
 Niki und der kleine Hund (pictures by Eva Czerwenka), 1998
 Niki wird gerettet. Eine Hundegeschichte (pictures by Eva Czerwenka), 1998
 Donnerwetter, Robert!, 1998
 Joseph und seine Schwester. Ein Stück aus der Bibel in 3 Akten, 1998
 Milo und die Jagd nach dem grünhaarigen Mädchen, 2000
 Rosa (pictures by Reinhard Michl), 2001
 Zanki Fransenohr. Eine Katzengeschichte aus Griechenland, Kinderstück, 2001 
 Schläft ein Lied in allen Dingen. Musikerzählungen, 2002
 Tims wundersame Sternenreise (pictures by Julian Jusim), 2004
 Das Geheimnis von Burg Wolfenstein, 2004
 Ohne Musik ist alles nichts, 2011
 Das Geschenk des weißen Pferdes, 2011
 Magdalena Himmelstürmerin, 2013

Filmography (script) 
 1985: Rita Rita 
 1989: Rosalinds Elefant
 1991: Wunderjahre
 2007: Toni Goldwascher 
 2011: Der Eisenhans 
 2012:

Radio plays 
 2009: Orphea und der Klangzauberer – director: Leonhard Huber (children radio play, 2 parts – /BR)

Further reading 
 Ulrike Bischof, Horst Heidtmann: „Die Sehnsucht der Bärin“ oder Rudolf Herfurtner als „Klassiker“ des deutschen Kindertheaters? Anmerkungen zu Herfurtners Stück „Der Nibeljunge“. In Beiträge Jugendliteratur und Medien, Weinheim, 48 (1996), 2, 
 Ursula Bold: Multitalent mit Substanz. Rudolf Herfurtner wird 50 Jahre alt. In Eselsohr, Munich 1997, 10, .
 Malte Dahrendorf: Bemerkungen zum Werk Rudolf Herfurtners. In Beiträge Jugendliteratur und Medien. Weinheim, 48 (1996), 2, .
 Gunter Reiß (ed.): Theater und Musik für Kinder. Beiträge und Quellen zu Herfurtner, Hiller, Ponsioen, Schwaen, zum Kinderschauspiel und Figurentheater. u. a. Lang, Frankfurt, 2001 (Kinder- und Jugendkultur, -literatur und -medien, vol. 12)

References

External links 
 
 

20th-century German writers
Dramaturges
German radio writers
German librettists
1947 births
Living people
People from Wasserburg am Inn